Cold-inducible RNA-binding protein is a protein that in humans is encoded by the CIRBP gene. The cold inducible RNA-binding protein CIRBP plays a critical role in controlling the cellular response upon confronting a variety of cellular stresses, including short wavelength ultraviolet light, hypoxia, and hypothermia.

References

External links

Further reading